This is a list of public art in the London Borough of Richmond upon Thames.



Barnes

Bushy Park

Ham and Petersham

Hampton and Hampton Hill

Hampton Court Palace

The King's Beasts

Terracotta roundels

Hampton Wick

Kew

Kew Gardens

The Queen's Beasts

Mortlake and East Sheen

Richmond

Teddington

Twickenham

Whitton

References

Bibliography

External links 
 

Richmond upon Thames
Richmond upon Thames
Tourist attractions in the London Borough of Richmond upon Thames